Chabahar County (formerly Chah Bahar County is in Sistan and Baluchestan province, Iran. The capital of the county is the city of Chabahar. At the 2006 census, the county's population was 214,017 in 41,532 households. The following census in 2011 counted 264,051 people in 58,039 households. At the 2016 census, the county's population was 283,204 in 68,147 households, by which time Talang Rural District had been separated from the county to join Qasr-e Qand County. Dashtiari District was separated from the county in 2018 to form Dashtiari County.

Administrative divisions

The population history and structural changes of Chabahar County's administrative divisions over three consecutive censuses are shown in the following table. The latest census shows three districts, six rural districts, and two cities.

Population 
As of 2008, more than half of the population were living in rural areas; the urban population is 77,128, of which a majority reside in Chabahar city. The aboriginal residents in the city of Chabahar are the Baluchis. In recent years, many people have immigrated to Chabahar from other parts of Iran to find a better life. Immigration changed Chabahar's face dramatically. Today Chabahar has a mix of different ethnicities including Baluchs, Turks, Sistanis (Zabolis), and other peoples of Iran.

Economy
Traditionally, the people of Chabahar County were employed in fishing and agriculture, with some coastal trade.  In the 1970s Iran established a naval station and an air base there. In the 1980s the port facilities at Chabahar were developed during the Iran–Iraq War, and further developed in the 1990s. The Chabahar Free Trade-Industrial Zone was established in 1992. These developments changed the county from primarily rural, to an urban–rural mix.

Chabahar County is the site of Iran's ballistic missile test range.

Tourism
Although some opportunities exist in Chabahar County for tourists, such as the village of Tis, folk festivals, and unusual landforms, tourism is undeveloped in Chabahar County.

References

 

Counties of Sistan and Baluchestan Province